Blanche A. Wilson House, also known as Centennial House, is a historic house in Aurora, Colorado that now serves as a museum. It is open for tour by the Aurora Historical Society on the second Sunday of the month in the summer season.

See also
National Register of Historic Places listings in Adams County, Colorado

References

External links
Aurora History Museum Education Programs - includes Centennial House tours 
 Historic Sites: Centennial House - Aurora Historical Society
National Register of Historical Places

Houses in Aurora, Colorado
Houses on the National Register of Historic Places in Colorado
Museums in Aurora, Colorado
Historic house museums in Colorado
National Register of Historic Places in Arapahoe County, Colorado